Harpalus breviusculus is a species of ground beetle in the subfamily Harpalinae. It was described by Maximilien Chaudoir in 1846.

References

breviusculus
Beetles described in 1846